Colonia Palma is a village in the Artigas Department of northern Uruguay.

Geography

History
On 13 September 2006, its status was elevated to "Pueblo" (village) by the Act of Ley Nº 18.014.

Population
In 2011 Colonia Palma had a population of 440.
 
Source: Instituto Nacional de Estadística de Uruguay

References

External links
INE map of Colonia Palma

Populated places in the Artigas Department